Danielle Blunden is a former Australian cricketer. She played five List A matches for Western Australia during the 1996–97 season of the Women's National Cricket League (WNCL).

References

External links
 

Year of birth missing (living people)
Place of birth missing (living people)
Living people
Australian cricketers
Australian women cricketers
Western Australia women cricketers